The CMLL World Light Heavyweight Championship (Campeonato Mundial de Peso Semicompleto del CMLL in Spanish) is a professional wrestling world heavyweight championship promoted by Consejo Mundial de Lucha Libre (CMLL) since 1991. As it is a professional wrestling championship, it is not won via legitimate competition; it is instead won via a scripted ending to a match or on occasion awarded to a wrestler because of a storyline. Because CMLL puts more emphasis on the lower weight classes, this division is considered more important than the heavyweight division, which is considered the most important championship by most promotions outside Mexico.

Niebla Roja is the current CMLL World Light Heavyweight Championship after winning a tournament for the vacant championship on June 10, 2017. He is the 16th overall champion and the 14th wrestler to officially hold the championship. The title has been vacated twice since its creation in 1991, and has had one unofficial reign.

History
The Mexican professional wrestling promotion Empresa Mexicana de Lucha Libre (EMLL; "Mexican Wrestling Enterprise") was founded in 1933 and initially recognized a series of "Mexican National" wrestling championships, endorsed by the Comisión de Box y Lucha Libre Mexico D.F. (Mexico City Boxing and Wrestling Commission). The Mexican National Light Heavyweight Championship was created in 1942 as EMLL began promoting matches for that championship with the approval and oversight of the wrestling commission. In the 1950s EMLL became a member of the National Wrestling Alliance (NWA) and began promoting the NWA World Light Heavyweight Championship in the late 1950s. Previously that championship had been promoted in the US, but the NWA gave EMLL full control of the championship in 1958, positioning the NWA title as the highest-ranking title in the light heavyweight division.

EMLL left the NWA In the late 1980s, and later rebranded themselves as "Consejo Mundal de Lucha Libre" (CMLL; "World Wrestling Council"). In 1991 CMLL decided to create a series of CMLL-branded world championships, with the CMLL World Light Heavyweight Championship (Campeonato Mundial Semicompleto de CMLL in Spanish) created as the second CMLL-branded championship, after the CMLL World Heavyweight Championship. Jerry Estrada was chosen as the first champion, with CMLL booking the tournament for the championship to end with Estrada defeating Pierroth Jr. In 1996 the then-champion Dr. Wagner Jr. lost the championship to Aquarius on a show in Japan, but the title change was not approved by CMLL and thus was never officially recognized. Dr. Wagner Jr. won the title back eight days later before returning to Mexico. Since the title change was not officially recognized, CMLL considers Dr. Wagner Jr. a two-time champion, not a three-time champion.

On January 15, 2013, then-reigning champion Rush voluntarily gave up the CMLL World Light Heavyweight Championship as part of his ongoing storyline feud with then-CMLL World Heavyweight Champion El Terrible. As part of the storyline, El Terrible stated that he would not defend against someone who represented a lower weight class, so Rush moved into the Heavyweight division for a title match. CMLL held a 16-man torneo cibernetico elimination match to determine which two wrestlers should compete in the finals for the vacant title. On January 29, 2013, Rey Escorpión defeated Volador Jr. in the tournament finals to become the 13th overall champion.

On April 8, 2016 La Máscara won the CMLL World Light Heavyweight Champion by defeating Ángel de Oro. On May 22, 2017, La Máscara was fired by CMLL and the championship was vacated. On June 10, 2017 Niebla Roja won the championship by outlasting 9 other wrestlers, Bárbaro Cavernario, Blue Panther, Carístico, Drone, Johnny Idol, Misterioso Jr., Pólvora, Reapper and Stuka Jr., in a 10-man torneo cibernetico elimination match.

Reigns

Niebla Roja is the current CMLL World Light Heavyweight Champion, having won the championship on June 10, 2017 in a show at Arena Coloso. Overall, there have been 16 reigns shared between 14 wrestlers, which does not include one unofficial reign by Aquarius. Only two men have held the title more than once; both Dr. Wagner Jr. and Atlantis have officially held the title twice. Because Aquarius' eight-day reign in 1996 is not officially recognized by CMLL, Jerry Estrada's 175-day reign is the shortest in the history of the championship. Not only was Último Guerrero's reign the longest of any individual reign, he is also credited with a record 22 confirmed championship defenses.

CMLL has declared the championship vacant on two separate occasions, which meant that there was no champion for a period of time. Sometimes, a championship is vacated due to an injury to the reigning champion, or when a champion stopped working for the promotion, but in the case of the CMLL World Light Heavyweight Championship, there was a storyline reason behind it being declared vacant the first time. In late 2013 the light heavyweight champion Rush was working a long-running storyline rivalry with El Terrible. When El Terrible won the CMLL World Heavyweight Championship, CMLL decided to enhance the rivalry by having Rush voluntarily give up the light heavyweight championship in order to receive a CMLL World Heavyweight Championship match against El Terrible. This allowed CMLL to advance the storyline as well as move the championship off Rush without having Rush lose a match, allowing Rey Escorpión to become the next champion. The second vacancy started on May 22, 2017 when CMLL fired the then-champion Máscara.

Rules

In the 20th century, CMLL were generally consistent and strict about enforcing the actual weight limits. In the 21st century the official definitions have at times been overlooked for certain champions. Although the heavyweight championship is traditionally considered the most prestigious weight division in professional wrestling, CMLL places more emphasis on the lower weight divisions.

With twelve CMLL-promoted championships labelled as "World" titles, the promotional focus shifts from championship to championship over time with no single championship consistently promoted as the "main" championship; instead CMLL's various major shows feature different weight divisions and are most often headlined by a Lucha de Apuestas ("Bet match") instead of a championship match. From 2013 until June 2016 only two major CMLL shows have featured championship matches: Sin Salida in 2013, and the 2014 Juicio Final show featuring the NWA World Historic Welterweight Championship. The last time a CMLL World Light Heavyweight Championship match was featured on a major CMLL show was on September 18, 2004, when Último Guerrero successfully defended the title at the CMLL 71st Anniversary Show. Championship matches usually take place under best two-out-of-three falls rules. On occasion single fall title matches have taken place, especially when promoting CMLL title matches in Japan, conforming to the traditions of the local promotion. Outside CMLL, the light heavyweight championship has been defended on joint CMLL/Universal Wrestling Association (UWA) shows in 1993, on W*ING, Big Japan Wrestling, Dragondoor and New Japan Pro-Wrestling shows in Japan.

Tournaments

1991
CMLL held a 16-man tournament from September 15 to October 26, 1991 to crown the first light heavyweight champion. Documentation on Pierroth Jr.'s path to the finals has not been found.

Tournament brackets

2013

CMLL held a tournament to determine the next CMLL World Light Heavyweight Champion starting on January 22, 2013, and the finals were held the following week. The first round of the tournament was a 16-man torneo cibernetico elimination match, with the last two men in the match qualifying for the finals the following week on January 29. The torneo featured two teams of eight wrestling against each other; Team A consisted of Delta, El Felino, La Máscara, Mephisto, Mr. Águila, Rey Escorpión, Stuka Jr. and Volador Jr. and Team B consisted of Atlantis, Blue Panther, Diamante, Euforia, Maximo, Morphosis, Psicosis and Sagrado. The match came down to Team A's Rey Escorpión and Volado Jr. versus Team B's Euforia. Escorpión pulled off Volador Jr.'s mask and threw it to rival Euforia, causing Euforia to be disqualified, which meant that Escorpión and Volador Jr. qualified for the finals the following week. On January 29, Rey Escorpión defeated Volador Jr. in the finals to become the 13th overall CMLL World Light Heavyweight champion.

Cibernetico order of elimination

Footnotes

References

External links
CMLL World Light Heavyweight title at Wrestling-titles.com

Consejo Mundial de Lucha Libre championships
Light heavyweight wrestling championships
World professional wrestling championships